Ősagárd is a village and commune in Nógrád County, Hungary with 296 inhabitants (2015).

References

Populated places in Nógrád County